This is a list of the last monarchs in Oceania.

References 

Last Oceania
History of Oceania
Monarchs in Oceania